Tawawa may refer to:

Tawawa, Ohio, unincorporated community in Green Township, Shelby County, Ohio
Tawawa House, an opera written by Zenobia Powell Perry

See also
Tawawa on Monday a Japanese collection of illustrations by Kiseki Himura